In mathematics, two square matrices  A and B over a field are called congruent if there exists an invertible matrix P  over the same field such that 

PTAP = B

where "T" denotes the matrix transpose.  Matrix congruence is an equivalence relation.

Matrix congruence arises when considering the effect of change of basis on the Gram matrix attached to a bilinear form or quadratic form on a finite-dimensional vector space: two matrices are congruent if and only if they represent the same bilinear form with respect to different bases.

Note that Halmos defines congruence in terms of conjugate transpose (with respect to a complex inner product space) rather than transpose, but this definition has not been adopted by most other authors.

Congruence over the reals

Sylvester's law of inertia states that two congruent symmetric matrices with real entries have the same numbers of positive, negative, and zero eigenvalues.  That is, the number of eigenvalues of each sign is an invariant of the associated quadratic form.

See also
Congruence relation
Matrix similarity
Matrix equivalence

References

 
 
 
 
 
 

Linear algebra
Matrices
Equivalence (mathematics)